The Queens is a grade II* listed public house and former hotel on the corner of Elder Avenue and Tottenham Lane in Crouch End, north London.

History
It was originally built as The Queen's Hotel by the architect and developer John Cathles Hill in 1898–1902, or 1899–1901, with art nouveau stained glass by Cakebread Robey. It was described in Pevsner as "one of suburban London's outstanding grand pubs".

It was accompanied by the Queen's Opera House which was opened in 1897 but damaged by bombing during the Second World War and subsequently demolished. It stood behind Topsfield Parade opposite the hotel.

The Queen’s features in the British gangster film Love, Honour and Obey (2000) where the main characters perform karaoke.

Gallery

See also
The Salisbury

References

External links 

Grade II* listed buildings in the London Borough of Haringey
Grade II* listed pubs in London
Commercial buildings completed in 1901
National Inventory Pubs
Buildings by John Cathles Hill
Pubs in the London Borough of Haringey
Crouch End
Defunct hotels in London